Canada competed at the 2011 Commonwealth Youth Games held in the British Crown Dependency of Isle of Man from 7 to 13 September 2011. Their participation marked their third Commonwealth Youth Games appearance. Canada was represented by the Commonwealth Games Canada, the association which is responsible for Commonwealth Games and Commonwealth movement in Canada. The delegation of 70 people included 56 competitors and 14 coaches and supporting staff.

Asianna Covington of Surrey, British Columbia, was given the honor to carry the national flag of Canada at the opening ceremony. Caroline Morin-Houde of Saint-Jean-sur-Richelieu, Quebec, was selected as the flag bearer in the closing ceremony.
This was the first time that Canada failed to win any gold medal, and devolved to 15th position with six silvers and 16 overall medals, Canada ranking fifth in the medal table (with six golds and 26 overall medals) of the previous Commonwealth Youth Games. Sprinter Caroline Morin-Houde was the most successful competitor from Canadian side, winning three silvers. Artistic gymnast Curtis Graves was the most medal winning athlete in the Canadian delegation, winning two silvers and two bronze medals. With one silver and one bronze, Shaina Harrison and Kal Nemier were other competitors who won multiple medals at the Games.

Medalists

A total of 20 out of 56 Canadian competitors won medals at the Games. The following Canadian competitors won medals at the Games. In the 'by discipline' sections below, medalists' names are emboldened.

| width="78%" align="left" valign="top" |

| width="22%" align="left" valign="top" |

Multiple medalists

Athletics

Athletics Canada, the national governing body of athletics in Canada, selected 21 athletes (nine men and twelve women) as a part of the delegation to participate in the athletics events. This was the second time in the history of the Games that Canada sent contingents for the athletics. Canada made its appearance in the athletics events of the Commonwealth Youth Games in 2008, where they won one gold, three silver and three bronze medals.

In the athletics team, there were nine men: Steven Ajayi (100 m), Drelan Bramwell (100– and 200 m), Jeremy Coughler (2000 m steeplechase), Christian Gravel (3000 m), Denray Jean-Jacques (400 m), Keefer Joyce (100 m), Troy Smith (1500 m), Matthew Swanson (800 m), and Jordan Wand (800 m), and twelve women: Mireille Aylwin-Descôteaux (2000 m steeplechase), Asianna Covington (discus and hammer throw), Adrianne Erdman (2000 m steeplechase), Taylor Farquhar (400 m hurdles), Emma Galbraith (800 m), Shaina Harrison (100 m), Alexa Hrycun (1500 m), Cassandra Jones (400 m), Vanessa McLeod (800 m), Caroline Morin-Houde (200 m), Brooke Rowland (javelin throw), and Marie-Colombe St-Pierre (200 m) athletes. The team was also accompanied by Christine Laverty as head coach, Jean-François Roy as team manager, and two event coaches George Kerr and Gregory Peters.

Men

Women

Badminton

Commonwealth Games Canada sent eight—four men and four women—badminton players to the Games, competing in all the events. None of the players succeeded in winning a medal. The doubles pair of Nathan Choi and Nyl Yakura advanced to the bronze final match where they lost to Srikanth Kidambi and Hema Thandarang of India.

Boxing

Canada entered four pugilists—Brody Pigeon (light flyweight), Jessy Brown (bantamweight), Luis Valdivia (welterweight) and Cody Crowley (middleweight)—to compete in the boxing events. Both Pigeon and Brown received byes in their first round matches. Pigeon eliminated in the second round (quarterfinal) after losing to Nyiko Ndukula of South Africa. Brown was the only medal winning Canadian boxer. He defeated Benjamin Henry of Guyana in the quarterfinal and Obedy Mutapa of Zambia in the semifinal. In the final bout, Brown lost to Qais Ashfaq of England by the points difference of 3 to 15, but his appearance in the final round helped him with the podium finish—a silver medal. Opponent of Valdivia, Kieran Smith, won the quarterfinal match due to walkover. Crowley defeated Tevita Pomale of Tonga in the quarterfinal, but lost to Dylan Hardy of Australia in the semifinal.

Cycling
Men

Women

Gymnastics
Artistic
Men

Rugby sevens

Canadian roster for the 2011 Commonwealth Youth Games consisted 12 players. Players were selected evenly from British Columbia and Ontario only. Shane Thompson, head coach of the Canadian National Under-18 Men's Sevens team, joined the team as coach, Jeff Williams as assistant coach and Darrell Devine as co-coach/manager.
Team Roster

Lukas Balkovec
Justin Douglas
Fergus Hall
Conor McCann
Andrew Battaglia
Haydn Evans
Lucas Hammond
Jorden Sandover-Best
Byron Boville
Scott Gauer
Patrick Kay
Nathan Yanagiya

Pool A

Quarterfinals
Canadian team qualified for the quarterfinal after finishing third in the pool A. On 11 September, team Canada played its quarterfinal match against the runner-up of pool B South Africa. South African team won the match with a goal difference of 24–12, and qualified for the semifinals.

Semi Final Plate and Bowl
After losing to South African team in the quarterfinal, Canadian team played against Trinidad and Tobago to qualify for the Grand Final Plate match. Canada beat Trinidad and Tobago with a goal difference of 60–7, largest margin victory of Canada in the tournament.

Grand Final Plate
Canada faced Isle of Man in the Grand Final Plate match. Isle of Man earned a place after beating Sri Lanka in the other semi Final Plate match. Similar to pool round match, Isle of Man remained scoreless and Canadian team with a goal difference of 52–0 won Grand Final Plate—equivalent to fifth position in the final standings.

See also
2011 Commonwealth Youth Games medal table
Canada at the 2010 Summer Youth Olympics

References

External links
Official website (results) of the Games
Official website of the Commonwealth Games Canada (for 2011 Commonwealth Youth Games)

2011 in Canadian sports
Nations at the 2011 Commonwealth Youth Games
Canada at multi-sport events